Caspase 13 or ERICE ("evolutionarily related interleukin-1β converting enzyme") is a protein that was identified in cattle. It belongs to a family of enzymes called caspases that cleave their substrates at C-terminal aspartic acid residues.  Although this enzyme was originally reported as a human caspase that could be activated by caspase 8, later studies confirmed the gene identified for caspase 13 came from bovine origin, and is the likely orthologue of human caspase 4.

References

External links
 The MEROPS online database for peptidases and their inhibitors: C14.017

EC 3.4.22
Caspases